= Renewable Energy in the Canary Islands =

The Canary Islands, an archipelago located in the Atlantic Ocean southwest of Spain and northwest of Africa, have experienced significant growth in renewable energy generation and consumption over the past decades. The renewable energy sources in the Canary Islands include solar, wind, geothermal, and ocean energy, as well as government policies, initiatives, and challenges associated with the adoption of renewable energy in the region. In 2020, renewables generated 17.5% of the total electricity on the Islands compared to 16.% a year before. Progress on this metric subsequently stagnated, with the total annual contribution of renewables hovering near 20% between 2021 and 2025. The largest island Tenerife is mainly focused on using fossil fuel imports to generate electricity.

== Solar Energy ==
The Canary Islands receive abundant sunlight throughout the year, making solar energy a valuable resource for the region. There has been a rapid increase in solar photovoltaic (PV) installations across the islands, both on rooftops and as ground-mounted solar parks. The regional government has implemented various incentives and subsidies to encourage the adoption of solar energy, such as tax credits and feed-in tariffs.

== Wind Energy ==
The Canary Islands' advantageous wind conditions have spurred the growth of wind energy projects in the region. As of 2021, several wind farms have been developed across the archipelago, with a combined capacity of over 400 MW. The regional government has also set ambitious goals for wind energy production and has been investing in the expansion of the sector.

== Geothermal Energy ==
While geothermal energy remains an underexplored resource in the Canary Islands, the region's volcanic origins provide significant potential for geothermal power generation. Research and development efforts have been initiated to explore the viability of geothermal energy in the region, with a focus on both electricity generation and direct use for heating and cooling applications. In 2022, the local government stated it plans to invest EUR 466M in developing geothermal resources. La Palma island is considered to have significant geothermal potential.

== Ocean Energy ==
The Canary Islands' strategic location in the Atlantic Ocean offers a unique opportunity to harness the power of waves, tides, and ocean currents for energy production. Although still in the research and development stage, several pilot projects have been launched to test the feasibility of ocean energy technologies, such as wave energy converters and tidal turbines.

The Canary Islands' regional government has been proactive in promoting renewable energy development, setting ambitious goals for a clean energy transition. Main policies and initiatives:

1. The Canary Islands Energy Strategy (EENCan): This long-term strategy outlines a roadmap for the region's energy transition, aiming to achieve 60% renewable energy generation by 2030 and 100% by 2050.
2. Financial Incentives: The government provides various incentives, such as tax credits, subsidies, and feed-in tariffs, to promote the adoption of renewable energy technologies.
3. Public Awareness Campaigns: The regional government has initiated several public awareness campaigns to encourage the adoption of energy efficiency measures and the use of renewable energy.
4. Research and Development: The Canary Islands have established a number of research institutions and technology centers focused on renewable energy, fostering innovation, and the development of new technologies.

== Challenges ==
The Canary Islands face several challenges in the transition to a renewable energy-dominated future, including grid integration, energy storage, and the need for a skilled workforce.

== Literature and official papers ==
Government paper
